R v Miller (case citation: [1982] UKHL 6; [1983] 2 AC 161) is an English criminal law case demonstrating how actus reus can be interpreted to be not only an act, but a failure to act.

Facts
James Miller, a vagrant, was squatting at 9 Grantham Road, Sparkbrook, an inner-city area in Birmingham, England, in August 1980 when he accidentally set fire to the mattress on which he was sleeping with a cigarette butt. Rather than taking action to put out the fire, he moved to a different room; the fire went on to cause extensive damage to the cost of £800. He was subsequently convicted of arson, under Sections 1 and 3 of the Criminal Damage Act 1971. Miller's defence was that there was no actus reus coinciding with mens rea. Although his reckless inattention to the fire could be said to constitute mens rea, it was not associated with the actus reus of setting the fire. Nevertheless, the defendant was convicted for recklessly causing damage by omission.

Judgment
Upon appeal to the House of Lords, Lord Diplock stated:

The decision in effect established that the actus reus was in fact the set of events, starting with the time the fire was set, and ending with the reckless refusal to extinguish it, establishing the requisite mens rea and actus reus requirements.

Therefore, an omission to act may constitute actus reus. Actions can create a duty, and failure to act on such a duty can therefore be branded blameworthy. Secondly, an act and subsequent omission constitute a collective actus reus. This has been described as the principle of 'supervening fault'.

Subsequent developments
The case of DPP v Santana-Bermudez examined a similar principle, in which the defendant was convicted of assault occasioning actual bodily harm under the Offences against the Person Act 1861 as a result of omitting to inform a police officer when questioned, that he had on his pocket a sharp object (needle).

References

Miller
House of Lords cases
1982 in British law
1982 in case law